Friedrich Schwarz (born 1880, date of death unknown) was a German fencer. He competed in the individual and team épée and sabre events at the 1912 Summer Olympics.

References

1880 births
Year of death missing
German male fencers
Olympic fencers of Germany
Fencers at the 1912 Summer Olympics
Sportspeople from Mainz